The Cheyenne Depot Museum is a railroad museum in Cheyenne, Wyoming. It is located inside the 1880s Union Pacific Railroad depot.  A National Historic Landmark, the station was the railroad's largest west of Council Bluffs, Iowa, and a major western example of Richardsonian Romanesque architecture.

The museum, founded in 1993, interprets Cheyenne's early history and that of the construction of the Union Pacific Railroad.  It houses multiple exhibits and occasionally offers tours of other railroad facilities.

History
The station is built from blocks of sandstone quarried in Fort Collins, Colorado. The Depot was built directly down the street from and facing the Wyoming State Capitol building, signaling its significance to the city and state.

The building was lengthened and renovated in 1922 and redecorated in 1929. More renovations were made from 2001 to 2006, including a $6.5 million improvement by the city of Cheyenne and a plaza built in front of the Depot. This plaza hosts a variety of music and events throughout the year.

Amtrak's San Francisco Zephyr ceased serving this station directly in 1979 in favor of a new station in Borie, nine miles to the west. This eliminated a time-consuming backup move in and out of the Cheyenne station. Passengers were bused between Borie and Cheyenne. Passenger rail service ended altogether in Wyoming when Amtrak canceled its Pioneer in 1997.

As of 2022, a new train service is proposed to connect Cheyenne and Pueblo, Colorado.

The Old West Museum and Cheyenne Frontier Days made an agreement that established the Cheyenne Depot Museum, Inc., as a 501(c)3 non-profit organization. The organization leased the depot from the city of Cheyenne for 25 years.

Gallery

See also

 Union Pacific 844
 Union Pacific 3985
 Union Pacific 4014
 Union Pacific 6936
 Cheyenne Frontier Days
 Cheyenne Frontier Days Old West Museum
 List of National Historic Landmarks in Wyoming
 National Register of Historic Places listings in Laramie County, Wyoming

References

External links

 Cheyenne Depot Museum Website
 The Rotary Steam Plow # 900082 in Cheyenne
 Union Pacific Depot National Historic Landmark at the Wyoming State Historic Preservation Office
 Union Pacific Roundhouse Turntable and Machine Shop at the Wyoming State Historic Preservation Office
 Union Pacific Passenger Station, 121 West Fifteenth Street, Cheyenne, Laramie, WY at the Historic American Buildings Survey (HABS)

Former Amtrak stations in Wyoming
Historic American Buildings Survey in Wyoming
Museums in Cheyenne, Wyoming
National Historic Landmarks in Wyoming
National Register of Historic Places in Cheyenne, Wyoming
Railroad museums in Wyoming
Railroad roundhouses in Wyoming
Railroad-related National Historic Landmarks
Railway stations on the National Register of Historic Places in Wyoming
Railway workshops in the United States
Transportation in Cheyenne, Wyoming
Transportation in Laramie County, Wyoming
Former Union Pacific Railroad stations
Railway roundhouses on the National Register of Historic Places
Railway workshops on the National Register of Historic Places
Railway stations in the United States opened in 1887
Industrial buildings and structures on the National Register of Historic Places in Wyoming
Railway stations closed in 1979
Repurposed railway stations in the United States